Mikko Kouki (born 14 September 1967) is a Finnish actor. He has appeared in more than thirty films since 1986.

Selected filmography

References

External links
 

1967 births
Living people
People from Lohja
Finnish male film actors
Finnish male television actors
21st-century Finnish male actors